Kasayapahuda (also Kasayaprabhrta) is one of the oldest canonical text of the Digambara Jains. Another oldest canonical text, the Shatkhandagama was written about the same time. Both these texts are held in high esteem by the Digambaras. Kasaya (passions) form the subject matter of Kasayapahuda.

Author 

Kasayapahuda was written by Acharya Gunadhara in the 1st century A.D.

Content 

Kasayapahuda discusses the Jain doctrine of Karma. The Kasayapahuda is written in verses only.

References

Sources 

Jain texts